Ji Ting (born October 11, 1982 in Shanghai) is Chinese football (soccer) player who played as a forward for the China national team and competed at the 2004 Summer Olympics. In 2004, she finished ninth with the Chinese team at the women's tournament. She played both matches and scored a goal.

International goals

References

External links
 Olympics player profile
Profile on Yahoo Sports

1982 births
Living people
Chinese women's footballers
China women's international footballers
Footballers at the 2004 Summer Olympics
Olympic footballers of China
Footballers from Shanghai
Women's association football forwards